Andrew Sharpe may refer to:
Andrew Sharpe, member of British band Steamchicken
Andrew Sharpe, Baron Sharpe of Epsom, British politician

See also
Andrew Sharp (disambiguation)